Branişte is a Romanian word of Slavic origin with the general meaning of "something protected", such as a royal property , a forest, etc. It is mainly found nowadays in place-names and may refer to:

 Branişte, a village in Daneți Commune, Dolj County, Romania
 Branişte, a village in Filiaşi Town, Dolj County, Romania
 Branişte, a village in Podari Commune, Dolj County, Romania
 Branişte, Rîşcani, a commune in Rîşcani district, Moldova

See also
 Bran (disambiguation)
 Brănești (disambiguation)
 Braniștea (disambiguation)